Iron-sulfur cluster assembly 1 homolog, mitochondrial is an evolutionarily highly conserved protein for the biogenesis of iron-sulfur cluster across species. In humans it is encoded by the ISCA1 gene.

References

Further reading